Sanu (also Romanized as Sanū) is a village in Zibad Rural District, Kakhk District, Gonabad County, Razavi Khorasan Province, Iran. At the 2006 census, its population was 922, in 316 families.

References 

Populated places in Gonabad County